Maddern is a surname. Notable people with the surname include:

 Anne Maddern (born 1955), Australian politician
 Barry Maddern (1937–1994), Australian barrister and jurist
 Clarence Maddern (1921–1986), American baseballer
 Philippa Maddern (1952–2014), Australian historian
 Rebecca Maddern (born 1977), Australian television presenter and journalist
 Victor Maddern (1928–1993), English actor
 Richard John Maddern-Williams,  music teacher and organist

See also
St Maddern's Church, Madron